John Roberton is the name of two Scottish physicians and social reformers:

John Roberton (born 1776), died 1840
John Roberton (born 1797), died 1876

See also
John Robertson (disambiguation)